"Wild Side" is a song by American singer Normani, featuring American rapper Cardi B. It was released through Keep Cool and RCA Records on July 16, 2021, as the lead single from Normani's upcoming debut solo album. The song marks her first radio single since 2019's "Motivation". It was written by the two artists alongside Keynon Moore, Pardison Fontaine, Starrah, Dave Cappa, Jonah Christian, June Nawakii, Taylor Ross, and Tyler Rohn, and was produced by the latter six and Normani.

"Wild Side" received critical acclaim upon release, with praise for the song's vocals and production. The song contains an interpolation of the 1996 Aaliyah single "One in a Million". It was released alongside a music video directed by Tanu Muino, who also directed Cardi B's "Up"; and was choreographed by Sean Bankhead, who also choreographed the music video for "Up", and Normani's "Motivation".

"Wild Side" debuted at number 14 on the Billboard Hot 100, while peaking at number-one on the R&B Streaming Songs chart, the R&B Digital Song Sales chart, and Urban Radio. It was one of the most thumbed up tracks of 2021 on Pandora; and was the third most watched R&B music video of 2021 in the United States, according to Vevo. The following year, IHeartRadio named it the fifth most played hip hop song of 2022.

The song and it's music video have been nominated for several accolades, including the MTV Video Music Award for Song of Summer, the Soul Train Music Award for Best Video of the Year and the MTV Europe Music Award for Best Video; along with winning the Soul Train Music Award for Best Dance Performance, and the UK Music Video Award for Best R&B/Soul Video - International.

Background and release
Normani went on a two-year hiatus from music after the release of the single "Motivation", in part due to the COVID-19 pandemic and the return of her mother's breast cancer. During that time period her mother encouraged her to focus on her career and making new music, in the process "Wild Side" was created.   Normani posted a snippet of "Wild Side" to her social media on February 5, 2021, with the caption, "know it's been awhile". Cardi B heard the snippet and later joined "Wild Side" according to the singer, with Normani stating "I knew I wanted to do something with her, but I was already in rehearsal for three weeks for the music video. We had already been in rehearsal, and I called her stylist because he's also my stylist, and I was like, 'Yo, like, we gotta figure something out. Like this link-up has to happen. There's no other way. It just has to happen, there's no option. 'And he was like, 'Actually, she mentioned "Wild Side", She was like, "Is it that "Wild Side" song? Is it the "Wild Side" song?"' Because I had posted the clip like two months ago".

After speculation of a collaboration between the two, Normani archived all but one post on her Instagram page on July 12, 2021, hinting at a possible relevant announcement. The following day, Cardi B stated that she had "a little secret" to tell her audience the following day. On July 14, Normani confirmed the title, release date and cover art of the collaborative single on her respective social media pages. Both performers had interacted in the past multiple times, with Normani making a special appearance in the music video for "WAP" by Cardi B and Megan Thee Stallion in August 2020 alongside other singers and personalities like Kylie Jenner and Rosalía.

Critical response 
"Wild Side" received critical acclaim upon its release. MTV News praised Normani's vocal performance, stating that she "delivers her silky verses with serenity and precision, sizzling with temptation and allure with every breath. She never leaves a moment unmilked; her voice masterfully floats along the song's subtle yet thumping production – sampling fellow R&B goddess Aaliyah's 1996 hit 'One In A Million'", and praised Cardi B's rapping on the song, noting that she "slides in with ease." For Pitchfork, Vrinda Jagota called it "a sultry R&B showstopper", adding, "If 'Motivation' was Normani's jubilant breakthrough, 'Wild Side' is the meticulously crafted showpiece that proves she's here to stay." For USA Today, Rasha Ali deemed it "a steamy, sensual slow jam." Victoria Moorwood of The Recording Academy, stated that the pair "stuck gold" with the songs Interpolation of "One In A Million".

In August 2021, Billboard placed the single on their 15 Best Aaliyah Samples in Modern R&B/Hip-Hop list. American gymnast Jordan Chiles, referred to "Wild Side" as one of her favorite songs. The song was named among 15 R&B songs that defined 2021 by BrooklynVegan.

Rankings

Accolades

Commercial performance 
In the United States, "Wild Side" debuted at number 14 on the Billboard Hot 100, marking Normani's third top 20 solo hit, and Cardi B's 16th; while becoming Normani's highest debuting song to date. It was the top-selling R&B release of the week in overall consumption, debuting at number 5 on the US Digital Song Sales chart. The song also debuted at number 10 on the US Rolling Stone Top 100, marking the biggest debut of the week on the chart. It also debuted simultaneously atop the R&B Streaming Songs chart, the R&B Digital Song Sales chart, and the R&B/Hip-Hop Digital Song Sales chart, while reaching number 3 on the Hot R&B Songs chart. In addition, "Wild Side" also debuted at number 27 on the Billboard Global 200 chart.

Less than three months after it was released, the song was certified Gold by the Recording Industry Association of America, for selling approximately 500,000 units in the US. The song reached the Top 10 on the Mainstream R&B/Hip-Hop airplay chart, after nine weeks. While later, reaching the Top 3 on the Mainstream R&B/Hip-Hop airplay chart, in the November 6, 2021 issue of Billboard. The following week, the single reached number-one on Urban Radio. In December 2021, it was announced that the song was one of the Top 20 most thumbed up tracks of 2021 on Pandora. On the January 1, 2022 issue of Billboard, the song reached number-one on the Mainstream R&B/Hip-Hop airplay chart, tying "Oui" by Jeremih for the fifth-longest march to number-one on the chart. "Wild Side" also reached the top ten on the Rhythmic Airplay chart, after 23 weeks on the chart, breaking the record for the longest climb to the chart's top 10 by a female artist, and the second overall, trailing only the 25-week wait of Los Del Rio's "Macarena (Bayside Boys Mix)".

Music video 
The official music video, directed by Tanu Muino, was released to YouTube alongside the song on July 16, 2021. The music video was choreographed by Sean Bankhead, drawing inspriation from Ciara's "Like a Boy" music video. The singer wears multiple outfits throughout the four-minute video, including a cutout black lingerie set with matching thigh-high boots in the first scene of the video, while doing exotic Yoga, a cropped leather outfit, and a leopard-print bustier. During her verse, Cardi B is featured completely nude wearing floor length hair extensions, while also embracing a nude Normani. Debra Paget in the movie The Indian Tomb, is briefly referenced in a scene from the music video.

The music video accumulated 1.5 million views in its first ten hours on YouTube, and cracked the Top 30 trending searches on Google. In December 2021, Vevo announced that the music video was the 3rd most watched R&B video of 2021 in the United States.

Reception 
For NPR, LaTesha Harris wrote "The video amplifies the single's debts to the past: dance moves inspired by Janet's 'Rhythm Nation'; visuals reminiscent of TLC, Blaque and Missy Elliot; and a direct nod to Golden Hollywood entertainer Debra Paget. And under all the pastiche is the intoxicating charisma of a star performer, a rare find these days, basking in the shadows of her foremothers." For The Los Angeles Times, Christi Carras praised Normani's choreography in the music video, commenting "When it comes to dancing, no one is doing it like Normani in "Wild Side" video". While Brooke Kato for The New York Post praised Cardi B's turn in the music video, stating "It's Cardi B's world and we're all just living in it."

The music video received praise and support from fans and celebrities across social media including Halle Berry, Ariana Grande, Victoria Monét, and Megan Thee Stallion. On Twitter, Lil Nas X deemed it the "best music video" he had ever seen in his entire life, adding "I am in [awe]. I am inspired!" Multiple publications referred to it as one of the biggest music videos of 2021, including Nylon, The New York Times, and Dazed, with the latter also referring to it as one of the "best music videos of 2021". In February 2022, Cosmopolitan placed it on its '42 Sexiest Music Videos of All Time' list.

Controversy 
In July 2021, Rolling Stone published an article titled "Why Queerbaiting Matters More Than Ever", in which music journalist Moises Mendez II accused Normani and Cardi B of queerbaiting in the music video for "Wild Side", noting that the two musicians "are pictured naked and gyrating against one another". The article sparked a response from Cardi B, in which she criticized the journalist for not acknowledging her own bisexuality, after coming out in 2018, stating "I'm married to a man but I have express soo much about my bisexuality and my experiences wit girls. All of a sudden 'queer baiting' is the new word & people use it to the ground!" She also added that the reason her and Normani embraced nude in the music video was to conceal her pregnancy, which she had not publicly revealed at the time the music video was shot, commenting "you do know we was trying to hide a whole baby bump right?".

Usage in media 
In July 2021, a "Wild Side" dance challenge started trending on social media, with the hashtag #WildSideChallenge garnering 15.6 million views on TikTok within a few weeks, with Brazilian singer Anitta, actress Storm Reid, along with American singers Lizzo, and Ciara participating in the challenge. English musician FKA Twigs also filmed a pole dancing routine featuring the song that she posted on TikTok. Some fans sustained injuries while attempting to learn the choreography, with one participant fracturing their foot.

American rapper Megan Thee Stallion referenced the song in her "Tuned In Freestyle", from her Something for Thee Hotties mixtape, with the lyrics "I wanna show my wild side, make them doo doo doo." In October 2021, Aespa member Karina performed a dance routine to "Wild Side" on the South Korean television program Knowing Bros. Later that month, singer Bryson Tiller sampled the single on his song "Are You Listening", from his Killer Instinct 2: The Nightmare Before mixtape. Brazilian singer Pocah paid homage to Normani in a photo shoot inspired by the song's music video. Comedian and singer DC Young Fly released an unofficial remix of the song.

Live performances 
Normani first performed "Wild Side" at the 2021 MTV Video Music Awards on September 12, 2021, after fans petitioned for her to perform on the show with the hashtag #LetNormaniPerform. The performance featured intense choreography, and a surprise cameo from Teyana Taylor, that paid tribute to Janet Jackson's live performances of "Would You Mind". It was positively-received by music critics. Pitchfork deemed it "the night’s most exciting performance", while calling Normani "one of her generation's most promising stars". While Rolling Stone wrote, "Normani stole the show in 'Wild Side', with the night's official instant-classic VMAs moment". According to Deadline, the performance was one of two most popular moments on social media that night.

The performance received criticism from David Portnoy, who claimed the positive response that the performance received was a double standard in comparison to the negative feedback for his sports blog, Barstool Sports. Portnoy tweeted, "I just want people to know, this is on VH1 right now, just like cable TV, anyone can watch this", "People say Barstool's too raunchy, like, that, you know, we're sexist, chauvinist pigs, can't let people see it, too over the top, smokeshows, but this girl, who's getting like face f—ed, and scissoring, right now just on VH1, this is cool." TMZ reported that the performance triggered complaints to the Federal Communications Commission "over what some say were raunchy displays".

Normani again performed an abbreviated version of "Wild Side" at Rihanna's  Savage X Fenty Show Vol. 3, which premiered on Prime Video on September 24, 2021. Normani "delivered a visually stunning set in a green catsuit, spiky bun, and lucite heels against a bright red backdrop, channeling the futuristic vibe of her music video," according to Erica Gonzalez for Elle.

Track listings 
 Digital download/streaming
 "Wild Side" (featuring Cardi B)3:29

 Digital download/streamingExtended version
 "Wild Side" (featuring Cardi B)3:29
 "Wild Side" (featuring Cardi B) [Extended version]4:08

 Digital download/streamingKaytranada Remix
 "Wild Side" (Kaytranada Remix)4:24

Credits and personnel
Credits adapted from Tidal.
 Normani – vocals, songwriting, production
 Cardi B – featured vocals, songwriting
 Starrah – songwriting, production, vocal production
 Nealante - producer, mixing
 Dave Cappa – songwriting, production
 Tyler Rohn – songwriting, production
 Jonah Christian – songwriting, production
 Pardison Fontaine – songwriting
 June Nawakii – songwriting, production
 Taylor Ross – songwriting, production
 Keynon Moore – songwriting
 Josie Aiello – backing vocals
 Jaycen Joshua – mastering, mixing
 Rachel Blum – mastering
 Brad Bustamante – engineering, recording, vocal production
 Jelli Dorman – engineering, recording
 Kuk Harrell – engineering, recording, vocal production
 DJ Riggins – assistant engineering
 Jacob Richards – assistant engineering
 Mike Seaberg – assistant engineering

Charts

Weekly charts

Year-end charts

Certifications

Release history

References

2021 singles
2021 songs
Normani songs
Songs written by Normani
Cardi B songs
Songs written by Cardi B
Songs written by Pardison Fontaine
Songs written by Starrah
American contemporary R&B songs
Music videos directed by Tanu Muino
RCA Records singles